was a town located in Asuwa District, Fukui Prefecture, Japan.

As of 2003, the town had an estimated population of 5,044 and a density of 36.62 persons per km². The total area was 137.73 km².

On February 1, 2006, Miyama, along with the town of Shimizu, and the village of Koshino (both from Nyū District), was merged into the expanded city of Fukui.

Dissolved municipalities of Fukui Prefecture
Fukui (city)